Kambozia Jamali (9 July 1938 – 24 May 2010) was an Iranian football midfielder who played for Iran in the 1964 Summer Olympics. He also played for Taj SC.

Record at Olympic Games

References

External links
 Kambozia Jamali's profile at Sports Reference.com
 
 TeamMelli.com
 FIFA.com

Iran international footballers
Iranian footballers
Esteghlal F.C. players
Esteghlal F.C. managers
1938 births
2010 deaths
Olympic footballers of Iran
Footballers at the 1964 Summer Olympics
People from Khorramabad
Association football midfielders
Iranian football managers